Attagenus punctatus is a species of beetle found in Europe and the Near East. In Europe, it is known from Austria, mainland France, Germany, Hungary, mainland Italy, Slovakia, Bosnia and Herzegovina, Croatia, Montenegro, North Macedonia, Serbia, and Slovenia.

External links
Attagenus punctatus at Fauna Europaea

Dermestidae
Beetles described in 1772
Taxa named by Giovanni Antonio Scopoli